Sumanya Purisai (born 5 December 1986) is a Thai professional footballer who plays as an attacking midfielder for Chonburi.

Club career
Purisai played for Osotsapa in the 2007 AFC Champions League group stages, scoring one goal. Purisai moved to Buriram FC in 2011, and won the 2011 Thai Division 1 League with them. After that he moved to Buriram United FC, expectations were high for him in Buriram United. He was not very successful with Buriram United, resulting in a move to Chainat Hornbill. Purisai was Chainat Hornbill's starting eleven, he regained his confidence in Chainat Hornbill. He continued to perform well in Chainat Hornbill. The 2013 Thai Premier League was Purisai's year as he scored and assisted many goals for Chainat Hornbill.

International career
He played for the Thailand national under-23 football team at the 2009 Southeast Asian Games. He scored an unofficial penalty against Denmark League XI in the 2012 King's Cup
He was part of the 2012 AFF Suzuki Cup, and he replaced Datsakorn Thonglao after Datsakorn suffered a groin injury during the tournament. In 2018 he was called up by Thailand national team for the 2018 AFF Suzuki Cup.

International Goals
Scores and results list Thailand's goal tally first.

Honours

Club
Buriram
 Thai Division 1 League (1): 2010
Port
 Thai FA Cup (1): 2019
BG Pathum United
Thai League 1 (1): 2020–21
 Thailand Champions Cup (1): 2021

International
Thailand
 AFF Championship (1): 2022

References

External links
 
 Sumanya Purisai profile at Bangkok United website
 

1986 births
Living people
Sumanya Purisai
Sumanya Purisai
Association football midfielders
Sumanya Purisai
Sumanya Purisai
Sumanya Purisai
Sumanya Purisai
Sumanya Purisai
Sumanya Purisai
Sumanya Purisai
Sumanya Purisai
Sumanya Purisai
Sumanya Purisai
Sumanya Purisai
Sumanya Purisai
2019 AFC Asian Cup players